Dendrotrochus is a genus of small air-breathing land snails, terrestrial pulmonate gastropod mollusks in the family Trochomorphidae, the hive snails.

Species
Species within the genus Dendrotrochus include:
 Dendrotrochus arrowensis (Le Guillou, 1842)
 Dendrotrochus cineraceus (Hombron & Jacquinot, 1841)
 Dendrotrochus coultasi Clench, 1957
 Dendrotrochus dahli Thiele, 1928
 Dendrotrochus helicinoides (L. Pfeiffer, 1849)
 Dendrotrochus huberi Thach, 2020
 Dendrotrochus kraemeri Thiele, 1928
 Dendrotrochus layardi (Hartman, 1889)
 Dendrotrochus leucotropis (Pfeiffer, 1861)
 Dendrotrochus mentum Hedley, 1899
 Dendrotrochus ponapensis
 Dendrotrochus stramineus Sykes, 1903
 Dendrotrochus thachi F. Huber, 2020
Species brought into synonymy
 Dendrotrochus labillardierei (E. A. Smith, 1884): synonym of Dendrotrochus helicinoides labillardierei  (E. A. Smith, 1884)
 Dendrotrochus ponapensis H. B. Baker, 1941: synonym of Ponapea ponapensis (H. B. Baker, 1941) (original combination)

References

 Delsaerdt A., 2016 Land snails on the Solomon Islands. Vol. III. Trochomorphidae and systematical review of all other families. Ancona: L'Informatore Piceno. 160 pp

External links
 Pilsbry, H. A. (1893-1895). Manual of conchology, structural and systematic, with illustrations of the species, Second series: Pulmonata. Vol. 9, Helicidae vol. 7, pp. 1-48, pls 1-14
 Solem, A. (1959). Systematics and zoogeography of the land and fresh-water Mollusca of the New Hebrides. Fieldiana Zoology. 4(3): 1-359

 
Trochomorphidae
Taxa named by Henry Augustus Pilsbry
Gastropod genera
Taxonomy articles created by Polbot